The canton of Corte is an administrative division of the Haute-Corse department, southeastern France. Its borders were modified at the French canton reorganisation which came into effect in March 2015. Its seat is in Corte.

It consists of the following communes:
 
Casanova
Corte
Muracciole
Poggio-di-Venaco
Riventosa
Santo-Pietro-di-Venaco
Venaco
Vivario

References

Cantons of Haute-Corse